Paul August Luedtke was a member of the Wisconsin State Assembly.

Biography
Luedtke was born on August 24, 1888, in Wausau, Wisconsin. He owned a decorating, wallpaper, paint business. He served on the Marathon County, Wisconsin Board of Supervisors and the Wausau Common Council. He died on June 18, 1969.

Career
Luedtke was a member of the Assembly from 1943 to 1962. He was a Republican.

References

Politicians from Wausau, Wisconsin
Wisconsin city council members
County supervisors in Wisconsin
1888 births
1968 deaths
20th-century American politicians
Republican Party members of the Wisconsin State Assembly